The Shire of Lillydale (note spelling difference from the suburb of Lilydale) was a local government area about  northeast of Melbourne, the state capital of Victoria, Australia.

History

The Lillydale Road District was first created on 19 September 1856, and became a shire on 16 February 1872. It was named after Lilly de Castella, the daughter of an Australian military officer. It lost its southwestern sections when the Borough of Ringwood (22 October 1924) and the Shire of Croydon (24 May 1961) severed from the shire and incorporated separately.

On 15 December 1994, the Shire of Lillydale was abolished, and along with the Shires of Healesville and Upper Yarra, and parts of the Shire of Sherbrooke, was merged into the newly created Shire of Yarra Ranges.

Council formerly met at the Shire Offices in Lilydale.

The term "Labor Omnia Vincit", on the former Shire of Lillydale logo, is Latin for "Work conquers all".

Wards

The Shire of Lillydale was divided into four ridings on 31 May 1988, each of which elected three councillors:
 North Riding
 East Riding
 South Riding
 West Riding

Suburbs and localities
 Chirnside Park
 Coldstream
 Gruyere
 Kalorama
 Kilsyth (shared with the City of Croydon)
 Kilsyth South
 Lilydale*
 Monbulk (shared with the Shire of Sherbrooke)
 Montrose
 Mooroolbark
 Mount Dandenong
 Mount Evelyn
 Olinda (shared with the Shire of Sherbrooke)
 Seville
 Silvan
 Wandin East
 Wandin North
 Warrandyte South (shared with the City of Doncaster & Templestowe)
 Wonga Park
 Yering

* Council seat.

Population

* Estimate in the 1958 Victorian Year Book.
+ Croydon severed in 1961 - combined population for 1961 is 33,978.

References

External links
 Victorian Places - Lillydale Shire

Lilydale
1994 disestablishments in Australia
Yarra Ranges
1856 establishments in Australia